Jisp is a village in the Dutch province of North Holland. It is a part of the municipality of Wormerland, and lies about 8 km west of Purmerend.

History
Jisp, in older forms Gispe (1328, 1387), Gyspe (1344), is named after a river with the same name, that had an open connection to the North Sea. Its river name is a composite of 'gis' and 'apa'. The first part means 'gisten', to foam. The second part has the meaning of water, indicating a place where by tidal influences foaming water occurred. River names containing 'apa' have possibly an prehistoric and Celtic origin, dating back to a period where humans did only live in the area in certain periods of the year to herd their cattle.

Jisp is a former whaling village. It used to be an island in the Zuiderzee. It was a separate municipality until 1991, when it merged with Wormer and Wijdewormer to form the new municipality of Wormerland.

Geography

Jisp is located in the Wormer- en Jisperveld.

Demographics
In 2001, the village of Jisp had 318 inhabitants. The built-up area of the village was 4.3 km², and contained 116 residences.
The statistical area "Jisp", which also can include the surrounding countryside, had a population of 1110 in 2020.

References

External links

 Winter flight over the village of Jisp

Former municipalities of North Holland
Populated places in North Holland
Wormerland